Andrzej Sztolf (9 June 1941 – 1 February 2012) was a Polish ski jumper. He competed in the large hill event at the 1964 Winter Olympics.

References

External links
 

1941 births
2012 deaths
Polish male ski jumpers
Olympic ski jumpers of Poland
Ski jumpers at the 1964 Winter Olympics
People from Przeworsk
Sportspeople from Podkarpackie Voivodeship
20th-century Polish people